Kekefia is a side-dish of the south-Eastern part of Nigeria, the meal is popular among the people in Bayelsa state.

Plantain is the main ingredient for the making the food, others include pepper, Onion, crayfish scent leaf, palm oil and salt.

Other foods 
Kekefia is served with sauce containing meat or fish.

References 

Vegetable soups
Nigerian soups